Luca Marin (born 9 April 1986 in Vittoria, Province of Ragusa) is a former Italian medley swimmer. He specialized in the 400 m medley, and won ten medals at European and World Championships in this event. At the 2006 European Short Course Swimming Championships he won a gold medal, beating László Cseh, the world record holder. At the top of his career, he was trained by the Albanian coach Gjon Shyti.

Biography
He participated at the 2004 Summer Olympics at Athens for Italy, reaching 10th place in the 400 m medley.  At the 2008 Summer Olympics he finished in 5th place in the same event, and 12th at the 2012 Summer Olympics.

Luca Marin was engaged to Laure Manaudou and Federica Pellegrini.

Curiosity
Marin represents the Knave (corresponding to the Jack in the Italian playing cards) within the communication code the duo formed by pro players Febo and Rico elaborated for their games since the mid-2000s during the Ossuccio Briscola Tournament.

References

External links
Luca Marin on Italian Swimming Federation's website  

1986 births
Living people
People from Vittoria, Sicily
Italian male swimmers
Olympic swimmers of Italy
Swimmers at the 2004 Summer Olympics
Swimmers at the 2008 Summer Olympics
Swimmers at the 2012 Summer Olympics
Swimmers at the 2016 Summer Olympics
World Aquatics Championships medalists in swimming
Medalists at the FINA World Swimming Championships (25 m)
European Aquatics Championships medalists in swimming
Mediterranean Games silver medalists for Italy
Mediterranean Games medalists in swimming
Swimmers at the 2009 Mediterranean Games
Sportspeople from the Province of Ragusa